The Non Resident Keralites Affairs  abbreviated as NORKA is a department of the Government of Kerala formed on 6 December 1996 to redress the grievances of Non-Resident Keralites (NRKs). It is the first of its kind formed in any Indian state. The department was formed in an attempt to strengthen the relationship between the NRKs and the Government of Kerala and to institutionalize the administrative framework. The field agency of NORKA is known as the NORKA Roots, which was set up in 2002 to act as an interface between the NRKs and the Government of Kerala.
It also acts as a forum for addressing the NRKs problem, safeguarding their rights and rehabilitating the returnees.

Amidst the COVID-19 outbreak, the NORKA-Roots portal facilitated registration from people all around the world to request to return to Kerala. The portal also allowed people stuck in different states of the country to register on their site from 29 April 2020.

References

External links 

 NORKA
 World Malayalee Council
 KERALA KALA SAMITI, BHUBANESWAR
 ALL INDIA MALAYALEE ASSOCIATION (AIMA)

1996 establishments in Kerala
Kerala diaspora
Government departments of Kerala
Diaspora ministries